Hadleigh Castle is an oil painting by the English painter John Constable, created in 1829.

John Constable visited Hadleigh Castle in 1814 and made a drawing of the castle. This he developed into a full-sized oil sketch in  preparation for a finished painting, executed  in 1829 and exhibited at the Royal Academy in the same year. The sketch is currently displayed at the Tate Gallery, London, while the finished painting now hangs in the Yale Center for British Art at New Haven, United States. Constable's painting, "one of his most monumental works" according to art historians Tammis Groft and Mary Mackay, shows Hadleigh Castle as a decaying man-made structure, succumbing to the elemental power of nature.

Notes

Bibliography

Groft, Tammis Kane and Mary Alice Mackay. (1998) Albany Institute of History & Art: 200 years of collecting. New York: Hudsdon Hills Press. .

Paintings by John Constable
1829 paintings
Collection of the Tate galleries
Architecture paintings
Paintings in the Yale Center for British Art
Hadleigh, Essex
England in art